Gisle Meininger Saudland (born 8 July 1986) is a Norwegian politician for the Progress Party.

Political career
Saudland was a deputy representative to the Storting for the period 2013–2017. He was elected representative to the Storting for the period 2017–2021 from the constituency of Vest-Agder, and re-elected in 2021.

Early and personal life
Saudland was born in Flekkefjord on 8 July 1986, and is a son of economist Eivind Sveinung Saudland and dentist Dagmar Ioana Meininger. 

He has a batchelor degree in social science from the University of Agder, and has worked as sales manager in Flekkefjord.

References

1986 births
Living people
People from Flekkefjord
University of Agder alumni
Progress Party (Norway) politicians
Members of the Storting
Vest-Agder politicians
21st-century Norwegian politicians